Guy Hance (1933 – 8 January 2008) was a deputy of Front National at the Parliament of Brussels from 1999 to 2004, and from October 2006 to January 2008. He died on 8 January 2008 in Brussels at age 74.

References

Sources 
Obituary 

Belgian politicians
1933 births
2008 deaths